The Detective's Stratagem is a 1913 American drama film featuring Harry Carey.

Cast
 Reggie Morris as The Bank Clerk
 Claire McDowell as Kate, the Bank Clerk's Sweetheart
 Harry Carey as Keene, the Detective
 Charles West as First Plotter (as Charles H. West)
 Joseph McDermott as Second Plotter
 Hector Sarno as Bartender (as Hector V. Sarno)
 Frank Evans as Policeman
 Edwin August as The Bank President (unconfirmed)
 Frank Norcross as In Detective Agency
 Raoul Walsh as Gang's Driver (unconfirmed)

See also
 List of American films of 1913
 Harry Carey filmography

External links

1913 films
American silent short films
American black-and-white films
1913 drama films
1913 short films
Silent American drama films
1910s American films